Rail Raisovich Abdullin (born 6 August 2000) is a Russian football player. He plays for FC Torpedo Vladimir.

Club career
He made his debut in the Russian Premier League for FC Rubin Kazan on 9 December 2018 in a game against FC Zenit Saint Petersburg, as a starter.

On 19 July 2019 he joined FC Neftekhimik Nizhnekamsk on loan.

References

External links
 
 
 

2000 births
Footballers from Kazan
Living people
Russian footballers
Association football defenders
Russia youth international footballers
FC Rubin Kazan players
FC Neftekhimik Nizhnekamsk players
FC Torpedo Vladimir players
Russian Premier League players
Russian First League players
Russian Second League players